Stewart Alexander Gray (born 16 October 1950) was an English professional footballer who played as a defender.

References

1950 births
Living people
Footballers from Doncaster
English footballers
Association football defenders
Doncaster Rovers F.C. players
Grimsby Town F.C. players
Frickley Athletic F.C. players
English Football League players